The Justin Lee Collins Show is a British television chat show presented by Justin Lee Collins that aired on ITV2 between 19 March 2009 and 21 May 2009. Collins has a small band on the show and a continuing theme is to mention Labi Siffre as part of a joke. The series ended after one series after Collins signed a two-year deal with Channel 5.

Guests

References

External links

2009 British television series debuts
2009 British television series endings
ITV (TV network) original programming
British television talk shows
Television series by All3Media